Michael Gill (born 19 March 1957) is a New Zealand cricketer. He played in nineteen first-class and eight List A matches for Central Districts from 1974 to 1982.

See also
 List of Central Districts representative cricketers

References

External links
 

1957 births
Living people
New Zealand cricketers
Central Districts cricketers
Cricketers from Whanganui